The Old Vic Tunnels was an underground arts venue and performance space beneath London Waterloo railway station. The space consisted of almost 30,000 square feet of unused railway tunnels. It officially opened its doors for the first time in 2009 and closed in March 2013.

In 2010 The Old Vic acquired Tunnels 228–232 from BRB (Residuary) and transformed it into a performance venue. It hosted numerous events including Banksy's UK Premiere of his documentary Exit through the Gift Shop and U.S. President Bill Clinton's latest fundraiser with the Reuben Foundation in May 2012.

In February 2013 it was announced that the Old Vic Tunnels would close its doors on 15 March 2013: 
"We have three great years to look back on, and are proud of the remarkable range of events and productions that we have presented in the space."

In 2014, Vans won the bidding to operate the Old Vic Tunnels and transformed them into a skate park called the House of Vans.

History
In February 2010, The Old Vic Theatre Trust acquired this new performance space beneath Waterloo station from BRB (Residuary). The unique venue showcased productions, performances and installations and was home to a series of innovative and surprising arts events. In 2010 the Old Vic Tunnels opened with the Lambeth Palace, an underground cinema built to screen the UK premiere of Banksy's film Exit through the Gift Shop, followed by the first major theatre production in the space – Ditch, by Beth Steel, a High Tide and the Old Vic Tunnels co-production. The Old Vic Tunnels was home to the British premiere of Scorched, a Dialogue and the Old Vic co-production by award-winning playwright Wajdi Mouawad. The Old Vic Tunnels was presented the Big Society Award by David Cameron in 2011.
The last professional theatre production at The Old Vic Tunnels was Top Story by Sebastian Michael, directed by Adam Berzsenyi-Bellaagh, which ended its run there on 2 February 2013.
From 9 August 2014 the space will be reopened under new management and the name House of Vans London

Notable events

The Old Vic Tunnels saw Edward Sharpe and the Magnetic Zeros create five nights of the Wild West on Mars featuring theatre companies and artists Theatre Delicatessen, BattleActs, Les Enfants Terribles and Phil Mann; the New York Dolls perform; Secret Cinema transformed the space into an Algerian market town; a summer term from the National Youth Theatre of Great Britain; Universal's Yellow Lounge and a Michelin Star pop-up restaurant. The Old Vic Tunnels hosted U.S. President Bill Clinton's fundraiser.

Artists in Residence scheme
There was an Underground Artist in Residence Scheme with a resident photographer, graffiti artist, designer, filmmaker and a DJ. Veuve Clicquot sponsored the build of a brand new piano bar which opened outside the Screening Room and Bloomberg continue to provide support as the Old Vic Tunnels Volunteers Partner.

New technology
In December 2011 the Old Vic Tunnels became an official YouTube partner. They rolled out an App for iPhone and Android to give their customers even more access with interactive maps and an integrated social network.

The Big Society Award
In 2011 British Prime Minister David Cameron presented the Old Vic Tunnels with the Big Society Award. In his speech, Cameron said:

Kevin Spacey, on receiving the award:

References

External links

The Old Vic Tunnels official website (archived 17 October 2013)

Theatres in the London Borough of Lambeth
Theatres in the London Borough of Southwark
Producing house theatres in London
Former music venues in London